Mia Smith (born 13 May 1994) is an English actress, best known for her role as Chloe Moore in Grange Hill.

Career
Smith appeared in a Max Speilman camera advert in 2000. In 2003, Smith appeared in Blue Murder for 2 episodes as Jade. She then went on to play Susie Dane in 1 episode of The Courtroom. Smith then went on to play the regular role of school bully Chloe Moore in the teen drama, Grange Hill from 2005 to 2008. Smith played Katy Black in an episode of Accused. Smith played Barry's wife in The Spencer-Green Project in 2012.

Filmography

References

External links

1994 births
Living people
English television actresses
English child actresses
21st-century English actresses
Actresses from Salford
People educated at Buile Hill High School